Sherry King Blakley-Vaughn, also known as Sherry Hinkle (March 16, 1962 – February 13, 2011) was an American stock car racing driver. She competed in NASCAR Goody's Dash Series races during the 1980s and 1990s.

Career
A native of San Antonio, Texas, Blakley made her debut in racing at age 16 at local tracks in central Texas, following having been a cheerleader at Texas Military Institute. She raced in the All Pro Series and Goody's Dash Series starting in the mid-1980s, becoming best known for a controversial sponsorship deal with Ramses prophylactics in 1994. She attempted to qualify for the Snowball Derby in 1990 and 1991, but failed to make the field for either race; she attempted to race in the Busch Series in 1994, but failed to qualify for any races, crashing in qualifying at Charlotte Motor Speedway.

Married to Jeff Blakely and with one son, Blakley died on February 13, 2011.

Motorsports career results

NASCAR 
(key) (Bold – Pole position awarded by qualifying time. Italics – Pole position earned by points standings or practice time. * – Most laps led.)

Busch Series

References

External links 
 

1962 births
2011 deaths
Sportspeople from San Antonio
Racing drivers from San Antonio
Racing drivers from Texas
NASCAR drivers
American female racing drivers
TMI Episcopal alumni
21st-century American women